Chavenon station (French: Gare de Chavenon) was a railway station in Chavenon, France.

Destinations
The following connections was offered:
 To  Montluçon
 To Moulins

This railway station was used too for the transport of coal produced in the nearby city of Buxières-les-Mines.

External links
  History and picture

Defunct railway stations in Auvergne-Rhône-Alpes
Railway stations closed in 1972